Jack Joseph Osbourne (born 8 November 1985) is an English media personality with dual American and British citizenship. The son of heavy metal singer Ozzy Osbourne, he starred on MTV's reality series The Osbournes (2002–2005), along with his father, mother Sharon, and sister Kelly. Osbourne has since pursued a career as a fitness and travel reporter, presenting shows such as Jack Osbourne: Adrenaline Junkie (2005–2009) and BBC's Saving Planet Earth (2007). In 2016, he and his father Ozzy travelled the world in the History Channel reality series Ozzy & Jack's World Detour.

Early life
Osbourne was born in London to heavy metal singer Ozzy Osbourne of Black Sabbath, and his wife and manager, Sharon (née Levy). Jack Osbourne has stated that his childhood was "perfectly happy and contented". For the first six years of his life, Jack lived in the Chiltern Hills in Buckinghamshire, then his parents moved the family to Los Angeles, America, but a year later the family returned to Buckinghamshire. When Osbourne was 11, the family moved back again to Southern California, this time to Beverly Hills. In spite of moving so many times at a young age, Osbourne did not find it disruptive.

One aspect of his life that constant moving did affect was his school life, and Osbourne soon despised going to school, which was not helped by the fact that he was diagnosed with a form of dyslexia at the age of eight, and ADHD at the age of 10. At the time, he was studying at a Christian school in Los Angeles. He returned to England for a year before returning to Los Angeles, where he was enrolled into the special needs Park Century School. At 14 he was offered an internship at Virgin Records, where his mother was managing the band The Smashing Pumpkins. After Sharon stopped managing that band, Osbourne started A&R scouting for Epic Records, where his father had been on for many years. Osbourne also helped his mother in managing his father's annual touring festival, Ozzfest, advising her about up-and-coming bands.

On his 13th birthday, Osbourne got drunk for the first time on whisky; by the time he was 14, he was drinking regularly and had started smoking marijuana. He started partying heavily, and made headlines on 21 April 2003, when he was admitted to a child psychiatric ward for an addiction to OxyContin. Osbourne's drug addiction escalated after his mother was diagnosed with cancer; he was as well battling with his own depression. His self-destructive behaviour came to a head when he attempted suicide by taking a cocktail of prescription pills and cutting his hands with shards of glass after hearing his girlfriend's ex-boyfriend pick up her phone when he called her. He woke up 12 hours later. Osbourne continued with his drug use until he realised that he "never wants to feel this way ever again" and admitted himself into an adolescent psychiatric ward. He spent 10 days detoxing and was moved to an adolescent rehabilitation center in Malibu, where he enrolled in a recovery program.

Career

Osbourne gained high visibility in 2002 after appearing in his family's reality television show The Osbournes, which aired on MTV and won an Emmy Award in 2002.  In the show, Osbourne was mostly shown as a rebellious teenager who liked to party and to fight with sister Kelly Osbourne. In a song by Tenacious D advertising The Osbournes, Jack Black sings the line "and he's got a big 'fro on his head" to describe Osbourne's curly hair that grew longer until he eventually shaved it off in the third season of the show. In 2002, Osbourne briefly appeared in Austin Powers: Goldmember along with the rest of his family, and subsequently starred in a Super Bowl XXXVI advertisement for Pepsi Twist with sister Kelly. From 2002 to 2003, Osbourne appeared in Season 6 of Dawson's Creek, playing Audrey's childhood friend. He also made cameos in The X Factor (as a "Goth rapper" who sings "Ice Ice Baby"), the fifth season of That '70s Show as a DMV customer and as a dining room guest in the eighth season of Hell's Kitchen. Post-rehab, Osbourne went on in 2003 to star in his own show on Channel 4, Union Jack. In 2004 he played a small role in New York Minute, a film starring the Olsen twins, in which he plays a music promoter named Justin.

In 2005, Osbourne started to show more of an interest in fitness through co-hosting the ITV2 show, Celebrity Wrestling: Bring It On!. In February that year, he appeared in Extreme Celebrity Detox in which he took part in t'ai chi and climbing exercises, which possibly inspired him to appear in his own programme, Jack Osbourne: Adrenaline Junkie produced by the same production company (Ginger Productions) as Extreme Celebrity Detox. Osbourne lost (50Lb) 23 kg in Thailand at a Muay Thai martial arts camp in Pattaya in order to be fit enough to climb El Capitan (which he achieved) whilst filming the first series of Jack Osbourne: Adrenaline Junkie. It aired on ITV2 in the UK, the Travel Channel in the United States, The LifeStyle Channel in Australia, GOtv in South Africa and on MuchMusic in Canada. Adrenaline Junkie focuses on Osbourne's training for sports like rock climbing, mountaineering and a jungle trek in Belize from the Chiquibul Chamber through dense jungle ending at Caracol ruins (guided by the UK extreme conservation organisation Trekforce). He showcased the effects of his weight loss with the two semi-naked photo shoots for Cosmopolitan magazine in 2005 to raise awareness of testicular cancer. The first, taken in June 2005, shows him sitting on a motorbike; the second appeared in the December 2005 issue. After the first series of Adrenaline Junkie he began filling in for Stephen Mulhern on CITV's Saturday morning kids' show Holly & Stephen's Saturday Showdown (which has since ended). Osbourne took part in Sport Relief and faced former singer in the band S Club 7, Bradley McIntosh, in a boxing match of three one-minute rounds to raise money for the charity. Osbourne won by a unanimous decision.

He once claimed to be considering a career in law enforcement and was on reality television show Armed & Famous. The show was pulled from CBS in January 2007, and Osbourne was sued by a woman from Muncie, Indiana, whose house was accidentally raided during filming. Osbourne also filmed a programme in Namibia for the BBC's Saving Planet Earth series. He also took part in the Mongol Rally with News Corporation director Andrew Knight's daughter, Amaryllis Knight. Osbourne and his family reunited with a reality TV show on Fox that debuted 31 March 2009, but was cancelled after the first episode.

Osbourne made and produced a documentary about his father that was originally to be titled to Wreckage of My Past: The Ozzy Osbourne Story, but was changed to God Bless Ozzy Osbourne. This film premiered in April 2011 at the Tribeca Film Festival and was released on DVD in November 2011. In early August 2010, Osbourne directed his first music video, for his dad's song "Life Won't Wait" from the album Scream. The video debuted on 23 August. Osbourne worked for Fuse News from February 2013 to early 2014. Osbourne also had a paranormal investigation show titled Haunted Highway that aired on Syfy for two six-episode seasons, during the summers of 2012 and 2013.

Between 2016 and 2018, Osbourne appeared with his father Ozzy in the U.S. worldwide buddy travelogue series Ozzy & Jack's World Detour on the History Channel. He currently has two paranormal television shows featured on the Travel Channel, which are Portals To Hell and The Osbournes Want To Believe with both of his parents Ozzy and Sharon.

Awards and achievements

Personal life
Osbourne and his girlfriend, actress Lisa Stelly, had their first child, a daughter, on 24 April 2012. Osbourne and Stelly were married in Hawaii on 7 October 2012. In August 2013, Osbourne and his wife announced they were expecting their second child, but on 6 September 2013, Osbourne's wife Lisa revealed she suffered a miscarriage in her second trimester; they had been expecting a son. Their next child, a daughter, was born on 13 June 2015. Their third child, a daughter, was born on 4 February 2018. The couple announced their separation on 18 May 2018. Their divorce was finalised on 5 March 2019.

Osbourne became engaged to fashion designer Aree Gearhart in December 2021. They welcomed their first child together, a daughter, on 9 July 2022.

In June 2012, Osbourne announced that he had been diagnosed with relapsing-remitting multiple sclerosis. He had experienced symptoms for a number of years including blindness in one eye; numbness in both legs; and problems with his bladder, bowel, and stomach. Osbourne injects Copaxone medication daily, uses vitamin supplements and hormone replacement therapy, and has travelled to Europe for stem cell therapy. He has also made lifestyle changes such as minimizing stress, exercising regularly, and significantly altering his diet. However, he has spoken of his fear of a rapid decline and has admitted that his doctors have urged him to stop participating in highly intensive physical workouts: "Right now am I going to be in a wheelchair?  No.  But if I don't take care of myself, who knows?" While appearing on Dancing with the Stars in October 2013, Osbourne said that he did not suffer from "any severe symptoms other than the odd bit of tingling down my leg and the occasional bout of fatigue."

References

Further reading
Ordinary People: Our Story (31 Oct 2004)

External links

The Osbournes
Jack Talks About His Addiction and Recovery

1985 births
English expatriates in the United States
English male film actors
Living people
Participants in American reality television series
People from Westminster
Ozzy Osbourne
People with multiple sclerosis
People with dyslexia
Jack
English male television actors
English people of Jewish descent